The Yellow Feather Mystery is Volume 33 in the original The Hardy Boys Mystery Stories published by Grosset & Dunlap.

This book was written for the Stratemeyer Syndicate by William Dougherty in 1954. Between 1959 and 1973 the first 38 volumes of this series were systematically revised as part of a project directed by Harriet Adams, Edward Stratemeyer's daughter. The original version of this book was shortened in 1971 by Priscilla Baker-Carr resulting in two slightly different stories sharing the same title.

Plot summary
The Hardy Boys go skating up Willow River toward Woodson Academy where they meet their chum Gregory Woodson.  Greg tells them about how his grandfather died seven weeks prior but no one has been able to find his will where he presumably leaves the Woodson Academy to Greg.  Greg is also curious about a strange letter that he received which was a blank piece of paper with small rectangular cutouts arranged horizontally and the word ‘Hardy’ printed on it.

With the grandfather's will missing, the school's headmaster Henry Kurt is trying to assume ownership of the school against Greg Woodson's wishes.  As the story progresses the Hardy Boys and their friends find themselves being attacked by unknown assailants until eventually they are able to locate the missing will and trap the dangerous criminal and solve the Yellow Feather mystery

References

The Hardy Boys books
1954 American novels
1954 children's books
1971 American novels
1971 children's books
Grosset & Dunlap books